Abongile Mzimkhulu Sodumo is a South African former first class cricketer. He is a right handed wicket keeper batsman. He is now an umpire.

References

External links
 

1982 births
Living people
South African cricketers
Border cricketers
Eastern Province cricketers
South African cricket umpires